William Cavendish, 3rd Duke of Devonshire,  (26 September 1698 – 5 December 1755) was a British nobleman and Whig politician who sat in the House of Commons from 1721 to 1729 when he inherited the Dukedom.

Life
Cavendish was the son of William Cavendish, 2nd Duke of Devonshire, and his wife, the Hon. Rachel Russell, and was known as Marquis of Hartington.

Like his father, Lord Hartington was active in public life. He was returned unopposed as member of parliament for Lostwithiel at a by-election in 1721. At the 1722 general election he was returned unopposed as MP for Grampound. He was also unopposed when he was returned as MP for Huntingdonshire at the 1727 general election. He surrendered the seat in 1729 when his father's death sent him to the House of Lords. He was made a Privy Counsellor in 1731. He served as Lord Privy Seal from 1731 to 1733, when he was invested as a Knight of the Garter. He later served for seven years as Lord Lieutenant of Ireland.

He sold the Old Devonshire House at 48 Boswell Street, Theobald's Road, in Bloomsbury, and in 1734 engaged the architect William Kent to build a new Cavendish House in fashionable Piccadilly. In 1739, he was enlisted as a founding governor of a new children's charity, the Foundling Hospital in Bloomsbury, London, which aimed to alleviate the problem of infants being abandoned by destitute mothers and which later became a centre for art and music.

During the Jacobite rising of 1745 the Duke raised a militia unit in support of the King known as the Derbyshire Blues, which mustered at the George Inn, Derby, on 3 December 1745.

Marriage and issue
On 27 March 1718, he married Catherine Hoskins (1700–1777), daughter of John Hoskins of Oxted (1640–1717) and Catherine Hale (1673–1703).

The Duke and Duchess had seven children:
 Lady Caroline Cavendish (22 May 1719 – 20 January 1760), who married William Ponsonby, 2nd Earl of Bessborough, and had issue.
 William Cavendish, 4th Duke of Devonshire (1720 – 2 October 1764)
 Lord George Augustus Cavendish (died 2 May 1794), died unmarried.
 Lady Elizabeth Cavendish (born before 1727 – died 1796), married John Ponsonby and had issue.
Lady Rachel Cavendish (7 June 1727 – 8 May 1805), who married Horatio Walpole, 1st Earl of Orford.
 Field Marshal Lord Frederick Cavendish (c. 1729 – 21 October 1803), died unmarried.
 Lord John Cavendish (c. 1734–1796)

References

External links 
 thePeerage.com

1698 births
1755 deaths
People from Derbyshire
Hartington, William Cavendish, Marquess of
Members of the Parliament of Great Britain for constituencies in Cornwall
Whig (British political party) MPs
British MPs 1715–1722
British MPs 1722–1727
British MPs 1727–1734
103
William Cavendish, 03rd Duke of Devonshire
Knights of the Garter
Lord-Lieutenants of Derbyshire
Lords Lieutenant of Ireland
Lords Privy Seal
Members of the Privy Council of Great Britain
Honourable Corps of Gentlemen at Arms
Cavendish, William
Parents of prime ministers of the United Kingdom